Beyond Good and Evil (Italian: Al di là del bene e del male; UK title: Beyond Evil) is a 1977 drama film directed by Liliana Cavani. It stars Dominique Sanda, Erland Josephson and Robert Powell. The film follows the intense relationship formed in the 1880s between Friedrich Nietzsche, Lou Salomé and Paul Rée.

This is the second part of "The German Trilogy" directed by Liliana Cavani. In The Night Porter she portrayed the connection between perversion and fascism. This time she depicts the life of Friedrich Nietzsche, a German philosopher who wrote Thus Spoke Zarathustra and Beyond Good and Evil.

Virna Lisi won the Nastro d'Argento Best supporting Actress award (Silver Ribbon) from the Italian National Syndicate of Film Journalists.

Cast
 Dominique Sanda - Lou Salomé
 Erland Josephson - Friedrich Nietzsche
 Robert Powell - Paul Rée
 Virna Lisi - Elisabeth Nietzsche
 Philippe Leroy - Peter Gast
 Elisa Cegani - Franziska Nietzsche
 Umberto Orsini - Bernhard Förster
 Michael Degen - Carl Andreas
 Nicoletta Machiavelli - Amanda
 Amedeo Amodio - Doctor Dulcamara
 Carmen Scarpitta - Malvida
 Clara Algranti - Madame Thérèse

External links

1977 films
Italian drama films
1977 drama films
1970s Italian-language films
English-language Italian films
1970s English-language films
Italian LGBT-related films
Films about Friedrich Nietzsche
1977 LGBT-related films
Films directed by Liliana Cavani
Films set in Italy
Films set in Germany
Films set in the 1880s
LGBT-related drama films
1977 multilingual films
1970s Italian films